Gamma-aminobutyric acid receptor-associated protein is a protein that in humans is encoded by the GABARAP gene.

Function 

Gamma-aminobutyric acid A receptors [GABA(A) receptors] are ligand-gated chloride channels that mediate inhibitory neurotransmission. This gene encodes GABA(A) receptor-associated protein, which is highly positively charged in its N-terminus and shares sequence similarity with light chain-3 of microtubule-associated proteins 1A and 1B. This protein clusters neurotransmitter receptors by mediating interaction with the cytoskeleton.

Moreover, GABARAP has an important function in autophagosome mediated autophagy, since it is crucial for autophagosome formation and sequestration of cytosolic cargo into double-membrane vesicles, leading to subsequent degradation after fusion with lysosomes. In addition, GABARAP can mediate selective autophagy because it binds to so-called autophagic receptors (e.g. p62, NBr1), which bind and recruit specific cargo.

Interactions 

GABARAP has been shown to interact with TFRC, ULK1 and GABRG2. A bound structure for GABARAP to GABRG2 consistent with experimental observations has been computationally derived.

References

Further reading